Friends Again may refer to:

In music:
 Friends Again (band)
 Friends Again, a single by My Morning Jacket
 Friends Again, a soundtrack of the television series Friends
 "Friends Again", a song from album Friends for Life by Montserrat Caballé
 "Friends Again", a song from album Rub It Better by General Public
 "Friends Again", a song from album Ten Thousand Bars by Ezio

In television:
 Friends Again (TV series)
 "Friends Again", an episode of The Real World: Sydney
 "Friends Again???", an episode of The Story of Tracy Beaker